The  is an electric multiple unit (EMU) commuter train type operated by the Hokuso Railway on the Hokuso Line in Japan since 2006.

Design
The design is based on the Keisei 3000 series.

Formation
, the fleet consists of three eight-car sets formed as shown below, with six motored (M) cars and two trailer (T) cars.

The two M1 cars each have two single-arm pantographs, and the M1' car has one.

See also
 Chiba New Town Railway 9200 series, a similar design owned by the Chiba New Town Railway
 Shin-Keisei N800 series, a similar design owned by Shin-Keisei

References

External links

 Nippon Sharyo information 

Electric multiple units of Japan
Train-related introductions in 2006
Nippon Sharyo multiple units
1500 V DC multiple units of Japan
Tokyu Car multiple units